Sequivirus is a genus of viruses in the order Picornavirales, in the family Secoviridae. Plants serve as natural hosts. There are three species in this genus. Diseases associated with this genus include: PYFV: vein-yellowing, yellow flecks and yellow/green mosaic symptoms in parsnip, and ‘yellow net', followed by yellow spots and leaf distortion in celery.

Taxonomy
The genus contains the following species:
 Carrot necrotic dieback virus
 Dandelion yellow mosaic virus
 Parsnip yellow fleck virus

Structure
Viruses in Sequivirus are non-enveloped, with icosahedral geometries, and T=pseudo3 symmetry. The diameter is around 25-30 nm. Genomes are linear and non-segmented, around 9kb in length.

Life cycle
Viral replication is cytoplasmic. Entry into the host cell is achieved by penetration into the host cell. Replication follows the positive stranded RNA virus replication model. Positive stranded RNA virus transcription is the method of transcription. The virus exits the host cell by tubule-guided viral movement.
Plants serve as the natural host. The virus is transmitted via a vector (insects (aphids). Transmission routes are vector and mechanical.

References

External links
 Viralzone: Sequivirus
 ICTV

Secoviridae
Virus genera